Carlos David Ruiz (born 10 November 1971) is an Argentine football manager and former player who played as a right back. He is the current manager of Arsenal de Sarandí along with Luca Marcogiuseppe.

Playing career
Born in Buenos Aires, Ruiz started his professional career with Racing Club de Avellaneda in 1992, but he never played a league game with the club. The following year, 1993, he joined Arsenal de Sarandí, where he played ever since, making him one of the club's longest serving players of all time. One of the highlights of his career was being part of the 2002 Arsenal team that was promoted to the Argentine Primera. During his career, he made 399 appearances for Arsenal, making him the most capped player in the club's history.

Coaching career
On 30 April 2010, Ruiz was named as caretaker coach of Arsenal de Sarandí and replaced Jorge Burruchaga.

Honours

Player
Arsenal de Sarandí
Copa Sudamericana: 2007

See also
List of one-club men

References

1971 births
Living people
Footballers from Buenos Aires
Argentine footballers
Association football defenders
Arsenal de Sarandí footballers
Argentine football managers
Arsenal de Sarandí managers